"La Raza" is a song by American rapper Kid Frost. It was released in 1990 as the lead single from his debut studio album Hispanic Causing Panic. "La Raza" is Spanish for "the race" or more symbolically "the people" as metonymy; it samples El Chicano's "Viva Tirado" from 1970 (a cover of the famous Gerald Wilson jazz composition). 

The single peaked at number 42 on the US Billboard Hot 100, number 17 in the Netherlands and number 27 in Flanders.  It is considered to be one of the first successful Latin hip hop songs.

There is also a remix, featuring his son; Scoop DeVille, Lil Rob and Diamonique. The part 2 of the song is featured on Frost's third studio album, Smile Now, Die Later, released in 1995.

Music video

The music video, which aired regularly on Yo! MTV Raps, was among the first to feature lowrider cars and trucks equipped with hydraulic suspensions. It was also groundbreaking in featuring various elements of the Chicano culture.

Charts

References

External links

1990 songs
1990 singles
Kid Frost songs
Spanglish songs
Gangsta rap songsHow
Spanish-language songs
Virgin Records singles